Roman Kim (born 11 October 1991) is a Kazakh violinist, composer and inventor.

Biography 
Roman Kim was born in Kazakhstan to a family with Tatar, Belarusian and Korean origins. He received his first violin at the age of five and at the age of seven he won first prizes in national competitions. He studied at the Central Music School in Moscow from 2000-2008 with Galina Turchaninova and was a scholarship student of the Mstislav Rostropovich Foundation.  He won the first International Russian Rotary Children’s Music Competition in 2002.  He attended master classes with Maxim Vengerov, Midori Goto, Lewis Kaplan, Miriam Fried and Gidon Kremer.

In 2008, at the age of 16, Roman Kim was admitted to the Cologne University of Music, where he studied with Viktor Tretyakov. In 2012 he won the first prize of the 28th Valsesia Musica in Italy. As a winner of the Cologne International Music Competition (2011), he played with the WDR Radio Orchestra of Cologne. Kim plays a violin by Giuseppe Guarneri (Cremona, 1695), owned by the Deutsche Stiftung Musikleben Foundation.
“My most important teachers were Moscow State Conservatory instructor Galina Turchaninova and Viktor Tretyakov,” Kim says. “Turchaninova gave me a wonderful technical basis, and Tretyakov affected me very strongly musically.”
Kim specializes in violin concertos of the Romantic period and virtuoso works for the violin. Kim has studied the bow and finger techniques of the legendary violinist Paganini in depth, and like Paganini, has created new arrangements for various musical works.
Kim has also stated that Jimi Hendrix is another source of inspiration for him.  
Kim’s version of Bach's "Air on a G String" brought him international recognition in 2011 and has been viewed over 700,000 times on YouTube.

Acclaim and honors 
Israeli virtuoso Ivry Gitlis described Kim's mastery of his instrument as "one of the most incredible playing I have heard since I was born!“ In 2016 he won the Ivry Gitlis prize at the Festival Le Printemps du Violon in Paris.

Transcriptions 
As a composer, Kim has created various transcriptions as well as works for violin and piano and a violin concerto premiered in Cluj-Napoca, Romania in 2017.

Transcriptions and compositions for solo violin

Dies Irae (2015)
Eine Kleine Nachtmusik (2019)
Highway Star (Deep Purple) (2017)
Love Me Two Times (The Doors) (2019)
I Brindisi
Requiem for Solo Violin
Air on the G string
First movement of Symphony No. 5 (Beethoven) (2022)

For violin and piano
Three Romances (2012–14)

For Violin and Orchestra
Violin Concerto (2017)

In 2018 Kim’s recording Kimpossible was released on the Sony label.

Style 
Kim is known for wearing prismatic glasses that he invented in 2014, believed to improve focus and concentration.

References 

1991 births
Living people
Male classical violinists
Kazakhstani classical violinists